Church of Charles Borromeo is a former Roman Catholic church in Pinsk, Belarus. Constructed between 1770 and 1782, it was consecrated in the name of St. Charles Borromeo, then reconstructed in the second part of the 19th century and dedicated to the Holy Trinity.

The church was closed by the Soviet authorities in the 1960s and repurposed as a music hall. Nowadays it is one of the cultural centres of Pinsk.

It is listed as a monument of historical heritage of Belarus.

History

Construction 
The Catholic parish on the outskirts of Pinsk in Karolin was established by the Polish-Lithuanian nobleman Jan Karol Dolski in 1695. In that year the first wooden church was constructed. In 1756 the Apostolic Union of Secular Priests arrived in Pinsk. They collected money and between 1770 and 1782 built a stone church. It was consecrated in 1784 in the name of St. Charles Borromeo.

18th–20th centuries 

By the end of the 18th century the order fell into decline. With the death of the last abbot, Isidor Kontonovich, the church was abandoned. In the second half of the 19th century, the building was restored and consecrated in the name of the Holy Trinity. Since 1912 the church has been a filial of the Cathedral Basilica of the Assumption of the Blessed Virgin Mary.

After World War II the church was active for several years but was then closed by order of the Soviet authorities in the 1960s. The building was repurposed as a concert hall for the pipe organ.

Architecture 
The church is an example of Baroque architecture combined with a castle-like style. The nave is divided by three bays. The original interiors were destroyed in the 1960s.

In the 1990s new window panes and an electric organ were installed in the church.

The latest restorations to the church were completed in 2013.

References

Sources 

Brick Gothic
Baroque church buildings in Belarus
Churches in Belarus
Landmarks in Belarus